Sinodolichos is a genus of flowering plants in the legume family, Fabaceae. It belongs to the subfamily Faboideae. It has two species and is found in China, Myanmar, Thailand, and Borneo.

References 

Phaseoleae
Fabaceae genera